The 116th Street station was an express station on the demolished IRT Ninth Avenue Line in Manhattan, New York City. It had three tracks and two island platforms. It opened on September 17, 1879 and closed on June 11, 1940. The next southbound local stop was 104th Street station until June 3, 1903 and then 110th Street. The next southbound express stop was 66th Street. The next northbound stop was 125th Street for all trains. The express run from this stop to 66th Street was the longest express segment out of all New York City elevated lines, bypassing seven local stations.

References

External links 
NYCsubway.org - The IRT Ninth Avenue Elevated Line-Polo Grounds Shuttle

IRT Ninth Avenue Line stations
Railway stations in the United States opened in 1879
Railway stations closed in 1940
Former elevated and subway stations in Manhattan
1879 establishments in New York (state)
1940 disestablishments in New York (state)